Mysterious Canada: Strange Sights, Extraordinary Events, and Peculiar Places is a reference book written by John Robert Colombo, chronicling the paranormal in Canada. Published in 1988 by Doubleday Canada Limited of Toronto, it said of itself that it posed more questions than it answered.

The book was split up by province or territory "in the form of a gazetteer", preceded by a Preface and Acknowledgments, and followed by a Bibliography and Index. Compiling major and minor mysteries from across Canada, Mysterious Canada presents more than five hundred mysteries, originating from 365 locations.

The author acknowledges in his forward that "[a]nyone who looks long and hard enough will no doubt find rational explanations for the mysteries in this book." He believes that all of the events have explanations, or are just rooted in myth and folklore.

1988 non-fiction books
Books by John Robert Colombo
Doubleday Canada books
Canadian non-fiction books